Marco  is an Italian masculine given name of Etruscan and Latin origin, derived from Marcus. It derives from the Roman god Mars. It has also Germanic origin from the element "marah".

A–L
Marco Alcaraz, Filipino actor, model, and former varsity basketball player 
Marco Alessandrini, Italian politician
Marco Amelia, Italian footballer
Marco Amenta, Italian director and producer
Marco Andreolli, Italian footballer
Marco Andretti, American racing driver
Marco Arment, American web developer
Marco Asensio, Spanish footballer
Marco Ballini, professional footballer in Thailand
Marco Banderas (born 1967), Spanish singer, actor
Marco Antonio Barrera, Mexican boxer
Marco Antonio Barrero, Bolivian footballer
Marco van Basten (born 1964), Dutch footballer
Marco Belinelli, Italian basketball player
Marco Biagianti, Italian footballer
Marco Boogers, Dutch footballer
Marco Borriello, Italian footballer
Marco Borsato, Dutch singer
Marco Brambilla, Italian-born Canadian artist and filmmaker
Marco Calliari, Canadian singer
Marco Casambre, Filipino professional footballer
Marco Cassetti, Italian footballer
Marco Castro (born 1976), Peruvian-American film director, actor
Marco Cheung (born 1999), Hong Kong professional footballer
Marco Chiudinelli, Swiss tennis player
Marco D'Amore, Italian actor
Marco Dapper, American actor and model
Marco Delvecchio, Italian footballer
Marco Di Vaio, Italian footballer
Marco Donnarumma, Italian artist
Marco Feingold, Austrian holocaust survivor, Salzburg Jewish community president, and centenarian
Marco Ferradini, Italian pop-rock singer
Marco Fu, Hong Kong snooker player
Marco Antonio Garcia Blanco, Mexican diplomat
Marco Giampaolo, Italian football coach
Marco Gonzales, American baseball player
Marco Grazzini, Canadian actor
Marco Gumabao, Filipino actor, model, and athlete
Marco Hietala, Finnish bassist and singer
Marco Höger, German footballer
Marco Ilsø (born 1994), Danish actor
Marco Ip, Hong Kong singer
Marco Jaggi, Swiss wrestler known as Ares
Marco Khan, Iranian actor
Marco Kreuzpaintner, German film director and screenwriter
Marco Kurz, German football manager
Marco Kwok, Hong Kong former professional cyclist
Marco Leonardi, Italian actor

M–Z
Marco Mak, Hong Kong film director, film editor, production manager, actor, screenwriter, film producer, music composer and assistant director
Marco Marzocca, Italian actor and comedian
Marco Masini, Italian pop singer
Marco Materazzi, Italian footballer
Marco Antonio Mazzini, Peruvian clarinetist
Marco Melandri, Italian motorcycle racer
Marco Mengoni, Italian pop singer
Marco Micone, Italian-Canadian playwright and journalist
Marco Minnemann, German drummer
Marco Morales, television and film actor in the Philippines
Marco Morales (American football), US American football player
Marco Motta, Italian footballer
Marco Ngai (born 1967), actor in Hong Kong
Marco Pantani, Italian road racing cyclist
Marco Paolini, Italian stage actor
Marco Pappa, Guatemalan footballer
Marco Parolo, Italian footballer
Marco Pastors, Dutch politician
Marco Pierre White (born 1961), English chef
Marco Pigossi, Brazilian actor
Marco Piqué, Surinamese-Dutch welterweight kickboxer
Marco Antonio Pogioli, Brazilian footballer
Marco Polo (1254–1324), Venetian trader and explorer
Marco Reus, German footballer
Marco Rojas, New Zealand footballer
Marco Rosa, Canadian ice hockey player
Marco Rossi (ice hockey) (born 2001), Austrian ice hockey player
Marco Ruben, Argentine footballer
Marco Rubio, Cuban-American senator from Florida
Marco Antonio Rubio, Mexican boxer
Marco Ruffo, Italian architect
Marco Scacchi, Italian composer
Marco Scutaro, baseball player
Marco Siffredi, French snowboarder and mountaineer
Marco Silva, Portuguese football manager and former player
Marco Simoncelli, Italian motorcycle racer
Marco Simone, Italian footballer
Marco Sison, Filipino singer, actor, and politician
Marco Solari (c. 1355–1405), Italian architect and engineer
Marco Antonio Solís, Mexican singer
Marco Storari, Italian footballer
Marco Streller, Swiss footballer
Marco Tardelli, Italian footballer
Marco Thomas (born 1983), American football player
Marco Torsiglieri, Argentine footballer
Marco Venegas (born 1962), Swedish politician
Marco Verratti (born 1992), Italian footballer
Marco Völler (born 1989), German basketball player
Marco Wegener (born 1995), Hong Kong professional footballer
Marco Werner (born 1966), winner of 24 Hours of Le Mans 2005 and 2006
Marco Wilson (born 1999), American football player
Marco Zoppo, Italian painter

Fictional
 Marco Pagot, the main protagonist in Porco Rosso
Marco Alessi, a character from the Neighbours
Marco Del Rossi, a character from the Degrassi: The Next Generation series
Marco Rossi (Metal Slug), a protagonist of the Metal Slug series
Marco (Shaman King), a character of Shaman King manga and anime
Marco Axelbender, a character in the movie Cars
Marco Super FAV18, a character in the movie Cars
Marco, a character in the manga/anime One Piece
 Marco Rodrigo Diaz de Vivar Gabriel Garcia Marquez, a character in the animated television series Sealab 2021
 Marco Bodt, a character in the anime/manga Attack on Titan (Shingeki no Kyojin)
 Marco Rodriguez, a character in Fear the Walking Dead, played by actor Alejandro Edda
 Marco Alisdair, a character from Erin Morgenstern's novel, The Night Circus
 Marco Diaz, a character from the Disney animated TV series Star vs. the Forces of Evil
Marco, a character from the science fantasy book series Animorphs
Marco, a mentioned brother of Lance from the Dreamworks animated web show Voltron: Legendary Defender
Marco, the main protagonist of the 2005 Marcanese computer-animated film Marco.

See also
Marco (disambiguation)

References

Italian masculine given names
Spanish masculine given names
Portuguese masculine given names
French masculine given names
Dutch masculine given names